Oran Herbert "Skinny" O'Neal (May 2, 1899 – June 2, 1981) was a Major League Baseball pitcher who played for the Philadelphia Phillies in  and .

External links

1899 births
1981 deaths
Baseball players from Missouri
Major League Baseball pitchers
Philadelphia Phillies players
Beaumont Exporters players
Bloomington Bloomers players
Bridgeport Bears players
Dallas Submarines players
Joplin Miners players
Longview Cannibals players
Los Angeles Angels (minor league) players
Okmulgee Drillers players
Pittsburg Pirates players
Salina Millers players
San Antonio Indians players
Sapulpa Yanks players
Springfield Ponies players
Wichita Falls Spudders players